Thavakkara Bus Terminal, also called Kannur Central Bus Terminal or Central Bus Terminal Complex, is a bus station in Kannur, Kerala, India. It is located near to Kannur Railway Station. It is also India's first bus terminal to be developed on a build-operate- transfer (BOT) basis.

Overview
The project is a joint venture of the Kannur Municipal Corporation and the KK Group, being implemented on Build-Operate-Transfer (BOT) concept. Most of the floors inside the terminal are marked for commercial purposes, which include central lobby, passengers waiting area and parking facilities.

Facilities
 Multiple Bus bays
 Parking Bay for Cars, Two Wheelers and Autorickshaws
 Food Courts
 Cloakroom
 Passenger Amenities

Services

Thavakkara Bus Terminal,  serves as the main boarding & alighting point in Kannur for all the passengers travelling outside city and state. It has buses catering to long distances services and short-distance buses.

There are many long-distance bus services which operates with in Kerala state and to various district headquarters. Interstate bus services towards Mangalore, Virajpet, Madikeri, Mysuru are also available from Thavakkara Bus Terminal.

The bus stand complex includes one luxury hotel, one budget hotel and one dormitory.

References

External links

Bus stations in Kerala
Transport in Kannur
Buildings and structures in Kannur
Year of establishment missing